The Major League Tournament (formerly known as the Premier Trophy) is the main domestic first-class cricket competition in Sri Lanka. It was established in 1938 and has existed under a number of different names. Matches before the 1988–89 season are not considered first-class. Relaunched as the Lakspray Trophy in 1988–89, it was renamed as the P. Saravanamuttu Trophy in 1990–91 and as the Premier Championship in 1998–99. There was a change of format in 2015–16 when it became the Premier League Tournament which was split into Tiers A and B the following year.

The league was cancelled in 2020–21 due to the COVID-19 pandemic and then a new temporary tournament was introduced in 2021–22 called the National Super Provincial 4-Day Tournament. This was contested by five provincial teams: Colombo District, Dambulla District, Galle District, Jaffna District and Kandy District. They played each other once each and then the top four went into a knockout semi-final round followed by a championship final in which Kandy District defeated Jaffna District, 7–10 April 2022.

Ahead of the 2022–23 season, the competition was relaunched with a rebranding as the Major League Tournament. The 26 first-class clubs are split into Groups A and B, each team playing the others in its group once each, and the two group winners meeting in a championship final.

Major League Tournament, 2022–23
The Major League Tournament in 2022–23 was split into Group A and Group B leagues. The following teams were involved:

Group A
 Burgher Recreation Club
 Colombo Cricket Club
 Colts Cricket Club
 Galle Cricket Club
 Kalutara Town Club
 Kandy Customs Cricket Club
 Kurunegala Youth Cricket Club
 Lankan Cricket Club
 Moors Sports Club
 Police Sports Club
 Ragama Cricket Club
 Sebastianites Cricket and Athletic Club
 Sinhalese Sports Club

Group B
 Ace Capital Cricket Club
 Badureliya Sports Club
 Bloomfield Cricket and Athletic Club
 Chilaw Marians Cricket Club
 Negombo Cricket Club
 Nondescripts Cricket Club
 Nugegoda Sports and Welfare Club
 Panadura Sports Club
 Saracens Sports Club
 Sri Lanka Air Force Sports Club
 Sri Lanka Army Sports Club
 Sri Lanka Navy Sports Club
 Tamil Union Cricket and Athletic Club

Final
The group winners were Colombo Cricket Club and Tamil Union Cricket and Athletic Club who contested the MLT Final at the Sinhalese Sports Club Ground, starting on 17 November 2022. The match was drawn after four days play (extended from the scheduled three) and Colombo were declared the winners as they had the larger first innings total. Tamil Union won the toss and batted first. At the end of the first day, they had reached 356/5 after their captain Sadeera Samarawickrama had scored 188. They were all out on day two for 558. Colombo had scored 149/2 at close of play that day and went on to 411/5 at close of play on the third day. At this point, the match should have ended but it was extended by another day so that the question of first innings lead could be settled. Colombo were eventually all out for 669 on day four, their innings including three centuries by Kamindu Mendis (105), captain Ashan Priyanjan (100) and Chamindu Wijesinghe (139). There was only time for another sixteen overs before the close but the match was played out and Tamil Union scored 145/4 in their second innings. Wijesinghe was voted "Player of the Match". The "Player of the Series" award went to Ragama batsman Nishan Madushka, who scored 1,229 runs.

List of winners
The champion team in each season since 1938 has been:

Daily News Trophy
1938 Kalutara Town Club
1938–39 Singhalese Sports Club
1939–40 Singhalese Sports Club
1940–41 Saracens Sports Club
1941–42 No competition
1942–43 No competition
1943–44 Singhalese Sports Club
1944–45 Singhalese Sports Club
1945–46 Tamil Union C & A Club
1946–47 Singhalese Sports Club
1947–48 Singhalese Sports Club
1948–49 Singhalese Sports Club
1949–50 Singhalese Sports Club

P. Saravanamuttu Trophy
1950–51 Tamil Union C & A Club
1951–52 Singhalese Sports Club
1952–53 Nondescripts Cricket Club
1953–54 Nondescripts Cricket Club
1954–55 Nondescripts Cricket Club
1955–56 Burgher Recreation Club
1956–57 Nondescripts Cricket Club
1957–58 Nondescripts Cricket Club
1958–59 Singhalese Sports Club
1959–60 Singhalese Sports Club
1960–61 Nondescripts Cricket Club
1961–62 Singhalese Sports Club
1962–63 University
1963–64 Bloomfield C & AC
1964–65 Nomads Sports Club
1965–66 No competition
1966–67 Singhalese Sports Club
1967–68 Nomads Sports Club
1968–69 Singhalese Sports Club
1969–70 Nondescripts Cricket Club
1970–71 Nondescripts Cricket Club
1971–72 Singhalese Sports Club
1972–73 Singhalese Sports Club
1973–74 Singhalese Sports Club
1974–75 Singhalese Sports Club
1975–76 Nondescripts Cricket Club

Robert Senanayake Trophy
1976–77 Nondescripts Cricket Club
1977–78 Singhalese Sports Club
1978–79 Nondescripts Cricket Club
1979–80 Colombo Cricket Club
1980–81 Bloomfield C & AC
1981–82 Bloomfield C & AC

Lakspray Trophy
1982–83 Bloomfield C & AC
1983–84 Singhalese Sports Club
1984–85 Colombo Cricket Club
1985–86 Singhalese Sports Club & Nondescripts Cricket Club
1986–87 Singhalese Sports Club
1987–88 Colombo Cricket Club
1988–89 Nondescripts Cricket Club & Singhalese Sports Club (inaugural first-class season)
1989–90 Singhalese Sports Club
1990–91 Singhalese Sports Club

P. Saravanamuttu Trophy
1991–92 Colts Cricket Club
1992–93 Singhalese Sports Club
1993–94 Nondescripts Cricket Club
1994–95 Singhalese Sports Club and Bloomfield C & AC
1995–96 Colombo Cricket Club
1996–97 Bloomfield C & AC
1997–98 Singhalese Sports Club

Premier Championship
1998–99 Bloomfield C & AC
1999–00 Colts Cricket Club
2000–01 Nondescripts Cricket Club
2001–02 Colts Cricket Club
2002–03 Moors Sports Club
2003–04 Bloomfield C & AC
2004–05 Colts Cricket Club
2005–06 Singhalese Sports Club
2006–07 Colombo Cricket Club
2007–08 Singhalese Sports Club
2008–09 Colts Cricket Club
2009–10 Chilaw Marians Cricket Club
2010–11 Bloomfield C & AC
2011–12 Colts Cricket Club
2012–13 Singhalese Sports Club
2013–14 Nondescripts Cricket Club
2014–15 Sri Lanka Ports Authority Cricket Club

Premier League Tournament
2015–16 Tamil Union Cricket and Athletic Club
2016–17 Singhalese Sports Club
2017–18 Chilaw Marians Cricket Club
2018–19 Colombo Cricket Club
2019–20 Colombo Cricket Club
2020–21 cancelled due to COVID-19 pandemic
2021–22 replaced by temporary regional competition

Major League Tournament
2022–23 Colombo Cricket Club

Wins by Clubs
 † Extinct Clubs            * Shared title

References

Cricket leagues in Sri Lanka
First-class cricket competitions
Sports leagues in Sri Lanka
Sri Lankan domestic cricket competitions